Tailevu Naitasiri F.C. is a Fijian football team playing in the second division of the Fiji Football Association competitions. It is based in Nausori, which is a town on the island of Viti Levu, and about 20 kilometers north of the capital, Suva. Their home stadium is Ratu Cakobau Park. Their uniform includes sky blue shirt, white shorts and blue socks.

History 
The Tailevu Naitasiri Football Association was formed in 1943, when some local clubs split from Rewa to form their own association.

Current squad
Squad for the [Fiji senior league#2021 FSL |2021 Fiji Senior League ]

Former players

  Adi Bakaniceva

See also 

 Fiji Football Association

References

Bibliography 
 M. Prasad, Sixty Years of Soccer in Fiji 1938–1998: The Official History of the Fiji Football Association, Fiji Football Association, Suva, 1998.

Football clubs in Fiji
1943 establishments in Fiji